The Molecular Foundry is a nanoscience user facility located at the Lawrence Berkeley National Laboratory in Berkeley, California, and is one of five Nanoscale Science Research Centers sponsored by the United States Department of Energy.

Overview
The Molecular Foundry was founded in 2003.  The building was completed on March 24, 2006. The current director, Kristin Persson, was appointed director of the Molecular Foundry in 2020. She follows permanent directors Jeff Neaton (2013-2019), Omar Yaghi (2012-2013), and Carolyn Bertozzi (2006-2010).

Users of the Molecular Foundry are provided with free access to instruments, techniques and collaborators for nanoscience research that is in the public domain and intended for open publication. Proposals for user projects are solicited to promote interdisciplinary collaboration among scientists studying nanoscale phenomena in materials science, physics, electrical engineering, environmental engineering, biology and chemistry in seven interdependent facilities.

Center facilities

 Imaging and Manipulation of Nanostructures, led by Facility Director Alex Weber-Bargioni and was founded by Miquel Salmeron. 
 Characterization and manipulation of nanostructures—from "hard" to very "soft" matter—combining electron microscopy, optical microscopy and scanning probe microscopy.
 Nanofabrication - The nanofabrication facility is led by Facility Director Stefano Cabrini and was founded by Jeff Bokor. 
 Advanced lithography and thin-film processing emphasizing integration with chemical and biological nanosystems and the development of nanoscale electronic, magnetic and photonic devices.
 Theory of Nanostructured Materials, led by Facility Director David Prendergast and was founded by Steven Louie.
 Theoretical support to guide understanding of new principles, behavior and experiments—including electrical transport in nanoscale molecular junctions, self-assembly of biological nanostructures and computation of spectroscopy at hybrid nanoscale interfaces.
 Inorganic Nanostructures, led by Facility Director Jeff Urban and was founded by A. Paul Alivisatos.
 The science of semiconductor, carbon and hybrid nanostructures—including design and synthesis of nanocrystals, nanowires and nanotubes—and study of their electronic applications.
 Biological Nanostructures, Led by Facility Director Corie Ralston and was founded by Carolyn R. Bertozzi.
 New materials based on the self-assembly of biopolymers and bio-inspired polymers, new probes for bio-imaging and synthetic biology techniques to re-engineer organisms and create hybrid biomolecules to interface with devices.
 Organic and Macromolecular Synthesis, led by Facility Director Yi Liu and was founded by Jean Fréchet.
 Studies of "soft" materials—including synthesis of organic molecules, macromolecules, polymers and their assemblies, with access to functional systems, photoactive, organic-inorganic hybrid and porous materials.
 National Center for Electron Microscopy (NCEM), led by Facility Director Andy Minor. NCEM was founded in 1983 as an independent DOE user facility and merged with the Molecular Foundry in 2014.
 Use and development of an array of electron microscopes, offering capabilities for materials characterization at high resolution.

User Program 
The Molecular Foundry has a user program that gives access to the center's expertise and equipment to external researchers. The program is open to scientists from academia, industry, and research institutes worldwide. The program enables collaboration between Molecular Foundry staff scientists, technical support staff, students, postdoctoral fellows, and collaborating guest scientists. Access is obtained through a brief, peer-reviewed proposal and is free for users who intend to publish their results.

References

Lawrence Berkeley National Laboratory
Nanoscale Science Research Centers
Laboratories in California
United States Department of Energy national laboratories
University and college laboratories in the United States
Research institutes in the San Francisco Bay Area